High School Musical is a 2006 American television film and the first installment in the High School Musical trilogy.

High School Musical may also refer to:

 High School Musical (franchise)
 High School Musical (soundtrack)
 High School Musical 2
 High School Musical 2 (soundtrack)
 High School Musical 3: Senior Year
 High School Musical 3: Senior Year (soundtrack), including the song "High School Musical"
 High School Musical: The Concert, a concert tour featuring the cast of the film
 High School Musical on Stage!, the stage adaption of the film
 High School Musical: Get in the Picture, a reality show related to the film series
 High School Musical: A Seleção, a reality television game show
 High School Musical: O Desafio, the spin-off starred by the winners
 High School Musical (book series)

Video games
 High School Musical: Sing It!, a video game based on the film for consoles
 High School Musical: Makin' the Cut!, a video game based on the film for Nintendo DS
 High School Musical 2: Work This Out!, a video game based on the film for Nintendo DS

See also
 High School Musical: El Desafío (disambiguation)
 Elementary School Musical (disambiguation)